Richard Streit Hamilton (born 10 January 1943) is an American mathematician who serves as the Davies Professor of Mathematics at Columbia University. He is known for contributions to geometric analysis and partial differential equations. Hamilton is best known for foundational contributions to the theory of the Ricci flow and the development of a corresponding program of techniques and ideas for resolving the Poincaré conjecture and geometrization conjecture in the field of geometric topology. Grigori Perelman built upon Hamilton's results to prove the conjectures, and was awarded a Millennium Prize for his work. However, Perelman declined the award, regarding Hamilton's contribution as being equal to his own.

Biography
Hamilton received his B.A in 1963 from Yale University and Ph.D. in 1966 from Princeton University. Robert Gunning supervised his thesis. He has taught at University of California, Irvine, University of California, San Diego, Cornell University, and Columbia University.

Hamilton's mathematical contributions are primarily in the field of differential geometry and more specifically geometric analysis.  He is best known for having discovered the Ricci flow and starting a research program that ultimately led to the proof, by Grigori Perelman, of William Thurston's geometrization conjecture and the Poincaré conjecture.

For his work on the Ricci flow, Hamilton was awarded the Oswald Veblen Prize in Geometry in 1996 and the Clay Research Award in 2003. He was elected to the National Academy of Sciences in 1999 and the American Academy of Arts and Sciences in 2003. He also received the AMS Leroy P. Steele Prize for Seminal Contribution to Research in 2009, for his 1982 article Three-manifolds with positive Ricci curvature, in which he introduced and analyzed the Ricci flow.

In March 2010, the Clay Mathematics Institute, having listed the Poincaré conjecture among their Millennium Prize Problems, awarded Perelman with one million USD for his 2003 proof of the conjecture. In July 2010, Perelman turned down the award and prize money, saying that he believed his contribution in proving the Poincaré conjecture was no greater than that of Hamilton, who had developed the program for the solution.

In June 2011, it was announced that the million-dollar Shaw Prize would be split equally between Hamilton and Demetrios Christodoulou "for their highly innovative works on nonlinear partial differential equations in Lorentzian and Riemannian geometry and their applications to general relativity and topology."

In 2022, Hamilton joined University of Hawaiʻi at Mānoa as an adjunct professor.

Mathematical work
As of 2022, Hamilton has been the author of forty-six research articles, around forty of which are in the field of geometric flows.

Harnack inequalities for heat equations
In 1986, Peter Li and Shing-Tung Yau discovered a new method for applying the maximum principle to control the solutions of the heat equation. Among other results, they showed that if one has a positive solution  of the heat equation on a closed Riemannian manifold of nonnegative Ricci curvature, then one has

for any tangent vector .

In 1993, Hamilton showed that the computations of Li and Yau could be extended to show that their differential Harnack inequality was a consequence of a stronger matrix inequality. His result required the closed Riemannian manifold to have nonnegative sectional curvature and parallel Ricci tensor (such as the flat torus or the Fubini–Study metric on complex projective space), in the absence of which he obtained with a slightly weaker result. Such matrix inequalities are sometimes known as Li–Yau–Hamilton inequalities.

Hamilton also discovered that the Li–Yau methodology could be adapted to the Ricci flow. In the case of two-dimensional manifolds, he found that the computation of Li and Yau can be directly adapted to the scalar curvature along the Ricci flow. In general dimensions, he showed that the Riemann curvature tensor satisfies a complicated inequality, formally analogous to his matrix extension of the Li–Yau inequality, in the case that the curvature operator is nonnegative. As an immediate algebraic consequence, the scalar curvature satisfies an inequality which is almost identical to that of Li and Yau. This fact is used extensively in Hamilton and Perelman's further study of Ricci flow.

Hamilton later adapted his Li–Yau estimate for the Ricci flow to the setting of the mean curvature flow, which is slightly simpler since the geometry is governed by the second fundamental form, which has a simpler structure than the Riemann curvature tensor. Hamilton's theorem, which requires strict convexity, is naturally applicable to certain singularities of mean curvature flow due to the convexity estimates of Gerhard Huisken and Carlo Sinestrari.

Nash–Moser theorem
In 1956, John Nash resolved the problem of smoothly isometrically embedding Riemannian manifolds in Euclidean space. The core of his proof was a novel "small perturbation" result, showing that if a Riemannian metric could be isometrically embedded in a certain way, then any nearby Riemannian metric could be isometrically embedded as well. Such a result is highly reminiscent of an implicit function theorem, and many authors have attempted to put the logic of the proof into the setting of a general theorem. Such theorems are now known as Nash–Moser theorems.

In 1982, Hamilton published his formulation of Nash's reasoning, casting the theorem into the setting of tame Fréchet spaces; Nash's fundamental use of restricting the Fourier transform to regularize functions was abstracted by Hamilton to the setting of exponentially decreasing sequences in Banach spaces. His formulation has been widely quoted and used in the subsequent time. He used it himself to prove a general existence and uniqueness theorem for geometric evolution equations; the standard implicit function theorem does not often apply in such settings due to the degeneracies introduced by invariance under the action of the diffeomorphism group. In particular, the well-posedness of the Ricci flow follows from Hamilton's general result. Although Dennis DeTurck gave a simpler proof in the particular case of the Ricci flow, Hamilton's result has been used for some other geometric flows for which DeTurck's method is inaccessible.

Harmonic map heat flow
In 1964, James Eells and Joseph Sampson initiated the study of harmonic map heat flow, using a convergence theorem for the flow to show that any smooth map from a closed manifold to a closed manifold of nonpositive curvature can be deformed to a harmonic map. In 1975, Hamilton considered the corresponding boundary value problem for this flow, proving an analogous result to Eells and Sampson's for the Dirichlet condition and Neumann condition. The analytic nature of the problem is more delicate in this setting, since Eells and Sampson's key application of the maximum principle to the parabolic Bochner formula cannot be trivially carried out, due to the fact that size of the gradient at the boundary is not automatically controlled by the boundary conditions.

By taking limits of Hamilton's solutions of the boundary value problem for increasingly large boundaries, Richard Schoen and Shing-Tung Yau observed that a finite-energy map from a complete Riemannian manifold to a closed Riemannian manifold of nonpositive curvature could be deformed into a harmonic map of finite energy. By proving extension of Eells and Sampson's vanishing theorem in various geometric settings, they were able to draw striking geometric conclusions, such as that if  is a complete Riemannian manifold of nonnegative Ricci curvature, then for any precompact open set  with smooth and simply-connected boundary, there cannot exist a nontrivial homomorphism from the fundamental group of  into any group which is the fundamental group of a closed Riemannian manifold of nonpositive curvature.

Mean curvature flow
In 1986, Hamilton and Michael Gage applied Hamilton's Nash–Moser theorem and well-posedness result for parabolic equations to prove the well-posedness for mean curvature flow; they considered the general case of a one-parameter family of immersions of a closed manifold into a smooth Riemannian manifold. Then, they specialized to the case of immersions of the circle  into the two-dimensional Euclidean space , which is the simplest context for curve shortening flow. Using the maximum principle as applied to the distance between two points on a curve, they proved that if the initial immersion is an embedding, then all future immersions in the mean curvature flow are embeddings as well. Furthermore, convexity of the curves is preserved into the future.

Gage and Hamilton's main result is that, given any smooth embedding  which is convex, the corresponding mean curvature flow exists for a finite amount of time, and as the time approaches its maximal value, the curves asymptotically become increasingly small and circular. They made use of previous results of Gage, as well as a few special results for curves, such as Bonnesen's inequality.

In 1987, Matthew Grayson proved a complementary result, showing that for any smooth embedding , the corresponding mean curvature flow eventually becomes convex. This result is sometimes known as the Gage–Hamilton–Grayson theorem. It is somewhat surprising that there is such a systematic and geometrically defined means of deforming an arbitrary loop in  into a round circle.

The modern understanding of the results of Gage–Hamilton and of Grayson usually treat both settings at once, without the need for showing that arbitrary curves become convex and separately studying the behavior of convex curves. Their results can also be extended to settings other than the mean curvature flow.

Ricci flow
Hamilton extended the maximum principle for parabolic partial differential equations to the setting of symmetric 2-tensors which satisfy a parabolic partial differential equations. He also put this into the general setting of a parameter-dependent section of a vector bundle over a closed manifold which satisfies a heat equation, giving both strong and weak formulations.

Partly due to these foundational technical developments, Hamilton was able to give an essentially complete understanding of how Ricci flow behaves on three-dimensional closed Riemannian manifolds of positive Ricci curvature and nonnegative Ricci curvature, four-dimensional closed Riemannian manifolds of positive or nonnegative curvature operator, and two-dimensional closed Riemannian manifolds of nonpositive Euler characteristic or of positive curvature. In each case, after appropriate normalizations, the Ricci flow deforms the given Riemannian metric to one of constant curvature. This has strikingly simple immediate corollaries, such as the fact that any closed smooth 3-manifold which admits a Riemannian metric of positive curvature also admits a Riemannian metric of constant positive sectional curvature. Such results are notable in highly restricting the topology of such manifolds; the space forms of positive curvature are largely understood. There are other corollaries, such as the fact that the topological space of Riemannian metrics of positive Ricci curvature on a closed smooth 3-manifold is path-connected. These "convergence theorems" of Hamilton have been extended by later authors, in the 2000s, to give a proof of the differentiable sphere theorem, which had been a major conjecture in Riemannian geometry since the 1960s.

In 1995, Hamilton extended Jeff Cheeger's compactness theory for Riemannian manifolds to give a compactness theorem for sequences of Ricci flows. Given a Ricci flow on a closed manifold with a finite-time singularity, Hamilton developed methods of rescaling around the singularity to produce a sequence of Ricci flows; the compactness theory ensures the existence of a limiting Ricci flow, which models the small-scale geometry of a Ricci flow around a singular point. Hamilton used his maximum principles to prove that, for any Ricci flow on a closed three-dimensional manifold, the smallest value of the sectional curvature is small compared to its largest value. This is known as the Hamilton–Ivey estimate; it is extremely significant as a curvature inequality which holds with no conditional assumptions beyond three-dimensionality. An important consequence is that, in three dimensions, a limiting Ricci flow as produced by the compactness theory automatically has nonnegative curvature. As such, Hamilton's Harnack inequality is applicable to the limiting Ricci flow. These methods were extended by Grigori Perelman, who due to his "noncollapsing theorem" was able to apply Hamilton's compactness theory in a number of extended contexts.

In 1997, Hamilton was able to combine the methods he had developed to define "Ricci flow with surgery" for four-dimensional Riemannian manifolds of positive isotropic curvature. For Ricci flows with initial data in this class, he was able to classify the possibilities for the small-scale geometry around points with large curvature, and hence to systematically modify the geometry so as to continue the Ricci flow. As a consequence, he obtained a result which classifies the smooth four-dimensional manifolds which support Riemannian metrics of positive isotropic curvature. Shing-Tung Yau has described this article as the "most important event" in geometric analysis in the period after 1993, marking it as the point at which it became clear that it could be possible to prove Thurston's geometrization conjecture by Ricci flow methods. The essential outstanding issue was to carry out an analogous classification, for the small-scale geometry around high-curvature points on Ricci flows on three-dimensional manifolds, without any curvature restriction; the Hamilton–Ivey curvature estimate is the analogue to the condition of positive isotropic curvature. This was resolved by Grigori Perelman in his renowned "canonical neighborhoods theorem." Building off of this result, Perelman modified the form of Hamilton's surgery procedure to define a "Ricci flow with surgery" given an arbitrary smooth Riemannian metric on a closed three-dimensional manifold. This led to the resolution of the geometrization conjecture in 2003.

Other work
In one of his earliest works, Hamilton proved the Earle–Hamilton fixed point theorem in collaboration with Clifford Earle. In unpublished lecture notes from the 1980s, Hamilton introduced the Yamabe flow and proved its long-time existence. In collaboration with Shiing-Shen Chern, Hamilton studied certain variational problems for Riemannian metrics in contact geometry. He also made contributions to the prescribed Ricci curvature problem.

Major publications

The collection 
 
contains twelve of Hamilton's articles on Ricci flow, in addition to ten related articles by other authors.

References

External links

 
 Richard Hamilton – faculty bio at the homepage of the Department of Mathematics of Columbia University
Richard Hamilton – brief bio at the homepage of the Clay Mathematics Institute
1996 Veblen Prize citation
 Lecture by Hamilton on Ricci flow

1943 births
Living people
Members of the United States National Academy of Sciences
Differential geometers
20th-century American mathematicians
21st-century American mathematicians
Princeton University alumni
Yale University alumni
Columbia University faculty
Clay Research Award recipients
Educators from Cincinnati
Mathematicians from Ohio
Cornell University faculty
University of California, San Diego faculty